Football Club Volendam is a professional football club based in Volendam, Netherlands. They play in the Eredivisie, the top tier of Dutch football from the 2022–23 season following promotion. Nicknamed "de Palingboeren", the club was founded as Victoria in 1920, changed its name to RKSV Volendam in 1923 and emerged as an exclusively professional club, FC Volendam, in 1977, following a split from its parent club. The team plays its home matches in the 6,984-capacity Kras Stadion, where it has been based since 1975.

The club has a reputation as the heen-en-weer club ("the back-and-forth club") due to its numerous promotions and relegations between the first and second tiers of Dutch football. They have achieved ten promotions to the Eredivisie; a record. Volendam also reached two KNVB Cup finals – in 1957–58 and 1994–95 – which ended in losses to two Rotterdam-based clubs, Sparta and Feyenoord, respectively.

History

Beginnings (1920–1955)
Football Club Volendam was founded as Victoria on 1 June 1920 by local fishermen. By 1923, the club was renamed to RKSV Volendam, simply known as Volendam and its official orange colours were established after having been red and black the previous years. Being from the piously catholic village of Volendam, the club soon joined the Roomsch-Katholieke Federatie (RKF) ("Catholic Football Association") of the Netherlands. In 1935 and 1938, Volendam won that competition until, in 1940 as part of the Second World War, the RKF was forced by the German occupation to merge into the Royal Dutch Football Association (KNVB). After the Second World War, Volendam played in the Tweede Klasse for a long time, despite being close to promotion several times. Professionalism was introduced in the Netherlands in 1954 and as a result, Volendam saw many players leave. For example, Alkmaar '54 signed the brothers Klaas, Evert and Thoom Smit from the club.

Professionalism (1955–1969)

A year later, in 1955, Volendam also entered professional football by means of the issue of bonds. Volendam ended its first season in third place and thus qualified for the first season of the second-tier Eerste Divisie; 1956–57. In the 1958–58 KNVB Cup, Volendam reached the final by beating MVV 1–3 in the semi-final. Sparta, however, proved too strong there, and Volendam finished runners-up. The following season, Volendam became champions in the Eerste Divisie A and thus promoted to the top-tier Eredivisie for the first time in club history. However, the euphoria was short-lived, and after one season at the highest level, the club suffered relegation again. Soon, the club had established its reputation as the Heen-en-weer club ("the back-and-forth club") due to its numerous promotions and relegations between the first and second tiers of Dutch football. Head coach Bram Appel piloted Volendam back to the Eredivisie within one season, honouring the club's new nickname. This time, however, the stay at the highest level was longer than one season. Striker Dick Tol, who would become the club's all-time top goalscorer, became the top goalscorer of the 1961–62 Eredivisie with 27 goals. After three seasons in the Eredivisie, the club once again suffered relegation in the 1963–64 season. The third promotion for Volendam took place in 1967 under the English manager Ron Dellow. That season also marked Dick Tol's final season before retiring, as he became top goalscorer of the Eerste Divisie.

1970s and 1980s
History was written in FC Volendam history in December 1971. The Portuguese Walter Ferreira signed a one-and-a-half-year contract with the club, making him their first foreign player. Despite this, Volendam suffered relegated to the Eerste Divisie in that season. The following season, 1972–73, in which Ferreira became club top scorer with 11 goals, Volendam narrowly missed out on promotion to the highest level. In the deciding match against De Graafschap, a draw was enough, but the club lost 1–0. Volendam then played in the Eerste Divisie for the first time for more than three consecutive seasons. Only in 1976–77 promotion was again achieved after play-offs. The club then split into a professional club, FC Volendam, and an amateur club RKAV Volendam in July 1977, marking the birth of the club known as Volendam today. After seventh and seventeenth places, respectively, in 1977–78 and 1978–79, the club relegated again. In 1982, Fritz Korbach was appointed as head coach. He was Volendam's first German manager and had previously successfully led FC Wageningen and PEC Zwolle to the Eredivisie. This turned out to be a perfect move, as he also led Volendam to the highest level in the 1982–83 season. As their former stay in the Eredivisie, they last two seasons before suffering another relegation. Under the guidance of new head coach Jan Brouwer, Volendam again became champions of the Eerste Divisie in the 1986–87 season and thus promoted back to the Eredivisie. In the autumn, an ambitious plan ensured Volendam salvation from financial ruin, which had threatened the club's existence for some years.

Throughout the years, Volendam spawned many talented players, such as Wim Jonk, Edwin Zoetebier, Arnold and Gerrie Mühren. The club also has an accomplished scouting and youth system, which spreads across many different countries.

Golden years (1987–1997)
In the 1989–90 Eredivisie season, Volendam achieved its best result ever by sixth in the table with 39 points. Three seasons later, the feat was repeated and sixth place was achieved once again. In 1995, FC Volendam reached the final of the KNVB Cup for the second time. This time, the opponent was Feyenoord at their home ground, De Kuip on 25 May. Volendam lost the match 2–1 after conceding goals by Gaston Taument and Michael Obiku. André Wasiman scored the sole goal for FC Volendam. Among the 7,000 travelling away fans from Volendam in De Kuip at that time were also Kees Kwakman and Jack Tuijp, who would later both make more than 100 appearances for FC Volendam themselves. For the first time in many years, Volendam managed stay in the Eredivisie for a longer period. From 1987 to 1998. the club played continuously at the highest level.

Ups and downs in the second tier (2009–present)

In 2009, FC Volendam suffered its latest relegation from the Eredivisie. In the 2007–08 season, Volendam had won the Eerste Divisie championship under the leadership of former professional footballer Stanley Menzo, who had secured the club's participation in the highest division in the following season. Menzo, however, did not extend his contract, which meant that Frans Adelaar took over as new head coach for the 2008–09 season. On 10 May 2009, the last matchday of the season, Volendam suffered relegated to the Eerste Divisie once again, after De Graafschap drew (2–2) and Roda JC's beat Feyenoord (2–3). The following season was dramatic for Volendam: they finished in 16th place in the second tier. In the 2010–11 season, Volendam was led by head coach Gert Kruys, who had come over from FC Dordrecht. Volendam finished in 6th place in his first season. In the following season, Volendam did not win a period title for the first time in a long time, which cost Kruys his job at the club. Between 2012 and 2015 and again between 2018 and 2019, the club was led by Hans de Koning, who had come over from Helmond Sport the first time. In the 2012–13 season, Volendam finished in 2nd place after losing its last game to Go Ahead Eagles. They were then defeated again by Go Ahead Eagles in the final of the playoffs for promotion. In that season, Volendam also managed to win a period title. Due to missing out on promotion, Volendam, for the first time since the start of the Eerste Divisie (1956), competed for more than five seasons in a row at the second level. In the 2014–15 season, Volendam again lost in the final of the promotion play-offs by losing 0–1 to De Graafschap at home, after the first leg had finished 0–0 in Doetinchem.

In the 2021–22 season, Volendam promoted to the Eredivisie again after 13 years of absence.

Honours
 Eerste Divisie
Winners (6): 1958–59, 1960–61, 1966–67, 1969–70, 1986–87, 2007–08
Promoted (4): 1976–77, 1982–83, 2002–03, 2021–22
KNVB Cup
Runners-up (2): 1957–58, 1994–95

Results

Domestic results
Below is a table with Volendam's domestic results since the introduction of the Eredivisie in 1956.

Current squad

On loan

Coaching staff

Former managers

 Leen van Woerkom (1955–58)
 Ger Stroker (1958–60)
 Bram Appel (1960–62)
 Piet Dubbelman (1962–64)
 Ron Dellow (1964–69)
 Hans Croon (1969–72)
 Joep Steur (1972–75)
 Arie Stehouwer (1975–76)
 Leo Steegman (1976–77)
 Jan Mak (1977–79)
 Henk Ellens (1979–80)
 Joep Steur (1980–81)
 Dick Maurer (1981–82)
 Fritz Korbach (1982–83)
 Cor van der Hart (1983–84)
 Joep Steur (1984) (a.i.)
 Simon Kistemaker (1984) (a.i.)
 Leo Beenhakker (1984–85)
 Barry Hughes (1985–86)
 Jan Brouwer (1986–88)
 Leo Steegman (1988–92)
 André Stafleu (1992–93)
 Fritz Korbach (1993–94)
 Wim Rijsbergen (1994–95)
 Bert Jacobs (1995–96)
 Jan Brouwer (1996) (a.i.)
 Hans van der Zee (1996–97)
 Dick de Boer (1997–99)
 Andries Jonker (1999–00)
 Henk Wisman (2000–04)
 Johan Steur (2004) (a.i.)
 Job Dragtsma (2004–05)
 Ernie Brandts (2005–06)
 Stanley Menzo (2006–08)
 Frans Adelaar (2008–09)
 Edward Sturing (2009–10)
 Johan Steur (2010) (a.i.)
 Gert Kruys (2010–12)
 Johan Steur (2012) (a.i.)
 Hans de Koning (2012–15)
 Robert Molenaar (2015–17)
 Misha Salden (2017–18)
 Hans de Koning (2018–19)
 Wim Jonk (2019–)

References

External links

 

 
Football clubs in the Netherlands
Football clubs in Edam-Volendam
Association football clubs established in 1977
1977 establishments in the Netherlands
Volendam